The British Society of Cinematographers Award for Best Cinematography in a Television Drama is an award given annually by the British Society of Cinematographers (BSC). It was first given in 2011, with a set of nominees being presented ever since. 

British cinematographer Gavin Finney is the only person to receive the award more than once, with two wins (2013 and 2015).

Winners and nominees

2010s

2020s

See also
 British Academy Television Craft Award for Best Photography & Lighting: Fiction
 Primetime Emmy Award for Outstanding Cinematography for a Single-Camera Series (One Hour)
 Primetime Emmy Award for Outstanding Cinematography for a Limited or Anthology Series or Movie

References

Awards for best cinematography
Awards established in 2011
British television awards